Rodgers House may refer to:

Places and structures

United States
(by state, then city)

 Humphreys-Rodgers House, Huntsville, Alabama, listed on the National Register of Historic Places (NRHP)
 Patrick Rodgers Farm, Pleasant Hill, California, NRHP-listed
 Moses Rodgers House, Stockton, California, listed on the NRHP in San Joaquin County, California
 Thomas Rodgers House, Paris, Kentucky, listed on the NRHP in Bourbon County, Kentucky
 Rodgers House (Shelbyville, Kentucky), listed on the NRHP in Shelby County, Kentucky

See also
 Rogers House (disambiguation)